RCDE could stand for:
 Reial Club Deportiu Espanyol de Barcelona, a sports club in Barcelona, Spain
 Roman Catholic Diocese of Erie, a catholic diocese in western Pennsylvania
 Roman Catholic Diocese of Evansville, a catholic diocese in Southwestern Indiana.